The Wonderful Day may refer to:

 The Wonderful Day (1929 film), a French silent comedy film
 The Wonderful Day (1932 film), a French comedy film 
 The Wonderful Day (1980 film), a French comedy film

See also
 Wonderful Day (disambiguation)
 Wonderful Days (disambiguation)